Li Xikan (born 11 April 1998), also known by his English name SayKan Lee is a Chinese singer and actor. He is a member of the Chinese boy group S.K.Y from the 2020 Chinese survival talent show We Are Young. On 27 January 2019, he won the "Most Popular Male Singer" award at the 2019 5th Ruili Music Festival.

Career

2007-2017
He played the actor Mu Jiale in the play. This is his first TV drama work.

2018: Idol producer
On 19 January 2018, the idol men's group competition and development reality show Idol Producer, was broadcast on iQiyi. . He finished the show in 13th place, four spots shy of joining the final group. On 21 September, he released the third single with MR- X  "I Don't Wanna Fight Tonight". On 12 October, he participated in the Youku variety show "Mars Intelligence Agency Season 4" which went live, and he sang the theme song "Monster Invasion" for the show. In the same month, he participated in the iQiyi reality business variety show "Fantasy Restaurant". On 3 December, his first personal EP "K" was released.

2019
On 27 January 2019, he won the 5th Annual Beauty Awards of Ruili, the Most Popular Male Singer of the year. On 1 June, he attended the "Young Influential Chinese Youth Star Charity Model Ceremony" and sang with Lu Yupeng and Deng Chaoyuan. The theme song "Embrace You" for the 30th World AIDS Day, and was awarded the "Chinese Youth Star Charity Advocate".

2020: debut
In 2020, he participated in a variety show We Are Young'', a variety show for the growth of youth, and finally joined the boy group "S.K.Y" and debuting in the first place. On 13 November, he served as a guest in the sixth episode of the "Mars Intelligence Agency Season 5" broadcast.
In April 2021, he joined Dragon TV's music label confrontation show "Youth and Melody" as the Kuyang family label family.

Filmography

Television series

Television shows

Discography

Albums

TV series originals

Collaborations

References

1998 births
Living people
Idol Producer contestants
Singers from Zhejiang
Chinese male dancers
21st-century Chinese male singers